I road, 1 Road or variant, may refer to :

 Interstate highways in the USA
 Corridor I of the Appalachian Development Highway System
 Toyota i-Road, 2013 Toyota Motors concept vehicle, see Toyota concept vehicles, 2010–19#i-Road
 Avenue I, New York City
 Avenue I (IND Culver Line)
 I Street Bridge
 List of highways numbered 1
 First Street (disambiguation)
 First Avenue (disambiguation)

See also
 I (disambiguation)
 1 (disambiguation)